Blue Christmas is the second album of Christmas music by country music artist Ricky Van Shelton. It features one original song and several others that were reprised from his first Christmas album, Ricky Van Shelton Sings Christmas.

Track listing
"Blue Christmas" (Bill Hayes, Jay Johnson) - 3:05
"Silver Bells" (Ray Evans, Jay Livingston) - 2:55
"Winter Wonderland" (Felix Bernard, Dick Smith) - 2:34
"Let It Snow! Let It Snow! Let It Snow!" (Sammy Cahn, Jule Styne) - 2:31
"Country Christmas" (Don Schlitz, Ricky Van Shelton) - 2:52
"Jingle Bell Rock" (Joe Beal, Jim Boothe) - 2:52
"Silent Night" (Franz Xaver Gruber, Joseph Mohr) - 3:25
"I Heard the Bells on Christmas Day" (Traditional) - 3:12
"O Come All Ye Faithful" (Frederick Oakeley, John Francis Wade) - 3:51
"Have Yourself a Merry Little Christmas" (Ralph Blane, Hugh Martin) - 3:34

Personnel
 Eddie Bayers - drums, percussion
 Pat Coil - keyboards, synthesizer
 Larry Franklin - fiddle
 Sonny Garrish - steel guitar
 Wes Hightower - background vocals
 John Hobbs - keyboards, piano
 Jim Hoke - saxophone
 Terry McMillan - harmonica
 Liana Manis - background vocals
 Brent Mason - electric guitar
 Larry Paxton - bass guitar
 John Wesley Ryles - background vocals
 Ricky Van Shelton - lead vocals
 Biff Watson - acoustic guitar

Chart performance

2000 Christmas albums
Christmas albums by American artists
Ricky Van Shelton albums
E1 Music albums
Country Christmas albums